Latin beta (uppercase: Ꞵ, lowercase: ꞵ), is an additional letter of the Latin script, based the letter beta from the Greek alphabet. The letter is used in the various languages of Gabon and has been used in Ndaʼndaʼ language in Cameroon to represent a sound similar to "v". It is typographically and linguistically unrelated to the similar looking letter eszett (ẞ, ß) used in writing German, which represents an "s" sound.

Usage 
The letter is used in the scientific alphabet of the languages of Gabon used for Pinji, Benga, Barama, Galwa, Viya, Kande, Kaning'i, Lumbu, Myene, Ndumu, Ngom, Njebi, Vove, Punu, Sangu, Shira and Vumbu languages.

Additionally, it has been used in 2013 in the alphabet made by Émile Gille Nguendjio for the Ndaʼndaʼ language, for example in the word káꞵé ([ka˥βe˥]), which means "cover". Nguendjio replaced it with the letter P in 2014.

Encodings

References

Bibliography 
 David Abercrombie, Elements of general phonetics, Edimborgh, Edinburgh University Press, 1967.
 Émile-Gille Nguendjio, Grammaire pratique du báŋgwà, Éditions Ifrikiya. Interlignes, 2013. OCLC 902724090.
 Actes du séminaire des experts, Alphabet scientifique des langues du Gabon (20/24 février 1989), Revue Gabonaise des Sciences de l’Homme, Libreville, Université Omar Bongo, vol. 2, 1990.
 Jean Alain Blanchon, Douze études sur les langues du Gabon et du Congo-Brazzaville, vol. 33, Munich, LINCOM Europa, 1999, p. 228. ISBN 3-89586-605-9.
 Michael Everson, Denis Jacquerye et Chris Lilley, Proposal for the addition of ten Latin characters to the UCS. ISO/IEC JTC1/SC2/WG2, Document N4297., 26 July 2012

B| Beta latin
Phonetic transcription symbols